Marapurani Katha is a 1967 Indian Telugu-language romantic drama film directed by V. Ramachandra Rao in his debut. A remake of the Tamil film Kai Kodutha Deivam (1964), it stars Krishna and Vanisri. The film was released on 27 July 1967.

Plot

Cast 
 Krishna
 Vanisri
 Chandra Mohan
 Kanchana
 V. Nagayya
 Raavi Kondala Rao
 Sandhya Rani
 M. V. Chalapathi Rao
 G. S. R. Murthy

Production 
The producers initially wanted to cast N. T. Rama Rao, Jaggayya and Savitri in the main roles, with V. Madhusudhana Rao as director. These plans were eventually dropped due to increasing production costs, so they instead cast Krishna, Vanisri and Chandra Mohan, with V. Ramachandra Rao making his directorial debut.

Soundtrack 
The music was composed by T. Chalapathi Rao.

References

Bibliography

External links 
 

1967 romantic drama films
1960s Telugu-language films
1967 directorial debut films
Films scored by T. Chalapathi Rao
Indian romantic drama films
Telugu remakes of Tamil films